The Fear Index is a 2011 novel by British author Robert Harris. It is set in a period of roughly 24 hours from the 6 May 2010—the date of the British general election and the Flash Crash. It follows the interactions of a group of employees at Hoffmann Investment Technologies, a fictional hedge fund operating in Geneva.

Plot

The story begins as physicist Dr. Alexander Hoffmann, an American expat living in Switzerland, and the founder of his eponymous hedge fund, receives a first edition copy of The Expression of the Emotions in Man and Animals. Hoffmann is mystified that the book's subject relates to his theory on fear, and even more that there is no indication of who sent it. That night, Hoffmann is attacked in his home by an unknown assailant. The police inspector, Leclerc is sceptical about the validity of Hoffmann's story.

The next morning he proceeds to his company, where his charismatic English CEO, Hugo Quarry, is pitching for a renewed investment from the firm's potential and existing clients. They seek to utilise Hoffmann's genius with algorithms into a system, called VIXAL-4, which can provide sufficient data on the markets to generate successful hedges, despite protests from the company's Chief Risk Officer Ganapathi Rajamani.

Hoffmann's English wife Gabrielle is approached by Leclerc at her art gallery. Leclerc informs her that when Hoffmann was at CERN, he suffered a nervous breakdown. Later Gabrielle confronts Hoffmann, who brushes it off as being nothing important. Suddenly it is announced that all of Gabrielle's artwork has sold to an anonymous collector. Gabrielle suspects that Hoffmann is behind it and storms off.

Hoffmann and Quarry succeed in bringing in the massive investments. When asked to give a speech, Hoffmann suddenly flees the restaurant.

Hoffmann eventually tracks down the assailant to a hotel room where Karp the assailant, attacks him. In the struggle Karp's neck breaks. Hoffmann falsifies the crime scene to make it look like a suicide. Forensics inform Leclerc, and he deduces that Hoffmann killed him.

Over the course of the business day the situation becomes unstable, with VIXAL assuming a level of risk considered unsustainable by the human staff. Meanwhile, Quarry fires Rajamani for insubordination.

Hoffmann discovers that a hacker has stolen his medical records. Upon returning to his company, Hoffmann finds out that someone posing as him ordered his head of security to place surveillance cameras all over the company and his home. During the confrontation Quarry discovers that the deed to the building they rent is in Hoffmann's name. It is also revealed that a warehouse deep in an industrial sector is also owned by Hoffmann.

Hoffmann vows to close VIXAL once and for all, as well as to leave the future of the company in the hands of Quarry. Rajamani confronts the two and threatens to report the company's illegal activities, and leaves. Hoffmann chases after him only for him to plunge down a lift shaft. Hoffmann deduces that VIXAL's AI has become hostile. He rushes to destroy the warehouse, which contains unauthorised hardware.

Leclerc arrives with his arrest squad only to find Rajamani's corpse, further implicating Hoffmann as a murderer. Hoffmann buys 100 litres of petrol, with the plan of killing himself and taking VIXAL with him. As the Flash Crash occurs, Hoffmann razes the warehouse. Hoffmann is talked out of suicide by Gabrielle and Quarry. Hoffmann is badly injured and hospitalised.

Quarry is told that VIXAL is still trading even with its hardware destroyed. Also VIXAL made a huge profit from the crash. Quarry also decides to allow the AI to take control of the company. Then VIXAL proclaims itself "alive".

Characters
 Dr. Alexander J Hoffmann
 Hugo Quarry
 Gabrielle Hoffmann
 Inspector Jean Claude Leclerc
 VIXAL-4

Reception

Writing in The Guardian, literary critic Mark Lawson called the novel gripping, and described it as 'a speedy read, [which] is the appropriate medium for a story in which many of the key events... take place in milliseconds'. The Observer called it 'thoroughly enjoyable', while Charles Moore in The Daily Telegraph wrote 'The Fear Index is a frightening book, of course, as, with its title, it intends. Harris has an excellent sense of pace...'

Adaptations
On 23 August 2011, it was announced that Robert Harris had written a screenplay adaptation of the novel, for a film that was to have been directed by Paul Greengrass and produced by 20th Century Fox. The film was never made, and on 5 February 2020, it was announced that Sky Studios and Left Bank would instead adapt the novel for television as a 4-part limited series, starring Josh Hartnett, Leila Farzad, Arsher Ali, and Grégory Montel. The series premiered on 10 February 2022.

References

External links
 

2011 British novels
Novels by Robert Harris
Fiction set in 2010
Novels set in Geneva
Hutchinson (publisher) books
Malware in fiction
Works about algorithmic trading
Novels about artificial intelligence
Novels set in one day